Coloration or colouration may refer to:

 Color, the visual perceptual property corresponding in humans to the categories called red, green, blue and others, along with any variation, quality, or property thereof
 Animal coloration, topic of research regarding animals' adaptive appearance
 Cryptic coloration or camouflage, making animals or objects hard to see or disguising them
 Color gradient, a range of position-dependent colors
 Coloration effect, one of the phenomenal effects of watercolor illusions
 Vowel coloration, an account for historical changes in vowel sounds according to Laryngeal theory

In music
 Color (medieval music), four distinct senses in medieval music theory:
Color (or colour), a repeating sequence of pitches found in Isorhythmic compositions of the 13th and 14th centuries
Coloration, a way of showing 3:2 rhythms in Mensural_notation#Proportions_and_colorations from the early 14c
More rarely 14/15c writers use color to describe the chromatic genus or the intervals produced by musica ficta; see chromaticism
Coloration or coloratura, ornamentation with many fast 'black' notes, the primary use of term from the 16c on
Colorist (music), descriptive term for German 16c keyboard composers renowned for use of coloratura or diminution
 Key coloration, characteristics of different keys in unequal tuning systems
A Colour Symphony, Op. 24 (1922), composition by Arthur Bliss
Chromesthesia, a synesthesic association of sounds and colors
Chromaticism, the extension of harmony beyond the diatonic system, usually in the context of the end of the common practice period
Colouration, tendency of various parts of a loudspeaker to carry on moving when the signal ceases

See also
 Color (disambiguation)
 Gradation (disambiguation)
 Color (law), semblance or implication of a right or authority